Tashkent (Taşkent) is a rural locality (a village) in Kurdymsky Selsoviet, Tatyshlinsky District, Bashkortostan, Russia. The population was 96 as of 2010. There are 2 streets.

Geography 
Tashkent is located 35 km west of Verkhniye Tatyshly (the district's administrative centre) by road. Achu-Yelga is the nearest rural locality.

References 

Rural localities in Tatyshlinsky District